Juan Pablo Purcell Salas (born 23 June 1993) is a field hockey player from Chile.

Career

Junior national team
Pablo Purcell made his debut for the Chile U–21 team in 2012 at the Pan American Junior Championship. He was Chile's top scorer of the tournament, scoring six in their bronze medal winning campaign.

Los Diablos
Purcell made his senior debut for Chile in 2013 at the South American Championship in Santiago.

Since his debut, Purcell has been a regular inclusion in the national squad. He has medalled with the team on numerous occasions, including silver at the South American Games in 2018, as well as the 2022 Pan American Cup.

In 2019 he was a member of the team at the Pan American Games in Lima.

References

External links

1993 births
Living people
Chilean male field hockey players
Male field hockey defenders
Competitors at the 2018 South American Games
South American Games silver medalists for Chile
South American Games medalists in field hockey
2023 Men's FIH Hockey World Cup players
21st-century Chilean people